Scouse, formally known as Liverpool English or Merseyside English, is an accent and dialect of English associated with Liverpool and the surrounding county of Merseyside. The Scouse accent is highly distinctive; having been influenced heavily by Irish, Norwegian, and Welsh immigrants who arrived via the Liverpool docks, it has little in common with the accents of its neighbouring regions or the rest of England. Scouse is also a general term for this pan-ethnic community or Liverpudlians in general. The accent is named after scouse, a stew eaten by sailors and locals.

The development of Liverpool since the 1950s has spread the accent into nearby areas such as the towns of Runcorn and Skelmersdale. Variations within Scouse have been noted: the accent of Liverpool's city centre and northern neighbourhoods is usually described as fast, harsh, and nasal, while the accent found in the southern suburbs of Liverpool is typically referred to as slow, soft, and dark. Popular colloquialisms have shown a growing deviation from the historical Lancashire dialect that was previously found in Liverpool, as well as a growth in the influence of the accent in the wider area. Natives and residents of Liverpool are formally referred to as Liverpudlians, but are more often called Scousers.

The northern variation of Scouse has appeared in mainstream British media but, until the 2010s, often served only to be impersonated and mocked in comedy series such as Harry Enfield & Chums and its Scousers sketch. It is consistently voted one of the least popular accents in the UK. Conversely, the Scouse accent as a whole is usually placed within the top two friendliest UK accents, alongside that of Newcastle upon Tyne.

Etymology
The word  is a shortened form of lobscouse, the origin of which is uncertain. It is related to the Norwegian lapskaus, Swedish lapskojs, and Danish labskovs (skipperlabskovs), as well as the Low German labskaus, and refers to a stew of the same name commonly eaten by sailors. In the 19th century, poorer people in Liverpool, Birkenhead, Bootle and Wallasey commonly ate scouse as it was a cheap dish, and familiar to the families of seafarers. Outsiders tended to call these people scousers. In The Lancashire Dictionary of Dialect, Tradition and Folklore, Alan Crosby suggested that the word only became known nationwide with the popularity of the BBC sitcom Till Death Us Do Part (19651975), which featured a Liverpudlian socialist and a Cockney conservative in a regular argument.

Origins
Originally a small fishing village, Liverpool developed as a port, trading particularly with Ireland. After the 1700s, it developed as a major international trading and industrial centre. The city consequently became a melting pot of several languages and dialects, as sailors and traders from different areas (alongside migrants from other parts of Britain, Ireland, and northern Europe) established themselves in the area. Until the mid-19th century, the dominant local accent was similar to that of neighbouring areas of Lancashire. The comedian and actor Robb Wilton (1881–1957), who was born in the Everton district of Liverpool, spoke with a dry Lancashire accent rather than a Scouse accent.

The influence of Irish (especially Dublin Irish) and Northern Welsh migrants, combined with other European accents, contributed to a distinctive local Liverpool accent. The first reference to a distinctive Liverpool accent was in 1890. Linguist Gerald Knowles suggested that the accent's nasal quality may have derived from poor 19th-century public health, by which the prevalence of colds for many people over a long time resulted in a nasal accent becoming regarded as the norm and copied by others learning the language.

Academic research
The period of early dialect research in Great Britain did little to cover Scouse. The early researcher Alexander John Ellis said that Liverpool and Birkenhead "had no dialect proper", as he conceived of dialects as speech that had been passed down through generations from the earliest Germanic speakers. Ellis did research some locations on the Wirral, but these respondents spoke in traditional Cheshire dialect at the time and not in Scouse. The 1950s Survey of English Dialects recorded traditional Lancastrian dialect from the town of Halewood and found no trace of Scouse influence. The phonetician John C Wells wrote that "the Scouse accent might as well not exist" in The Linguistic Atlas of England, which was the Survey's principal output.

The first academic study of Scouse was undertaken by Gerald Knowles at the University of Leeds in 1973. He identified the key problem being that traditional dialect research had focused on developments from a single proto-language, but Scouse (and many other urban dialects) had resulted from interactions between an unknown number of languages.

Phonology

Vowels

 As other Northern English varieties, Scouse lacks the foot-strut split, so that words like cut , luck  and up  have the same  phoneme as bull , foot  and put . Speakers attempting to distinguish between the two typically use a stressed  for the former set: , resulting in a Welsh English-like strut-schwa merger. However, this often leads to hypercorrection, so that good luck may be pronounced .
 Words such as grass, path and sample have a short , rather than the long  due to the lack of the trap-bath split: .
This causes minimal pairs such as look and luck, and book and buck. The use of a long  in such words is more often used in working-class accents; however, recently this feature is becoming more recessive, being less found with younger people.
As in Geordie,  for standard  may also occur, as in maggot .
 In final position,  tend to be fronting/backing diphthongs with central onsets . Sometimes this also happens before  in words such as school .
 The  vowel is tense  and is best analysed as belonging to the  phoneme.
 There is not a full agreement on the phonetic realisation of :
 The  vowel  typically has a front second element .
 The  vowel  is typically diphthongal , rather than being a monophthong  that is commonly found in other Northern English accents.
 The  vowel  has a considerable allophonic variation. Its starting point can be open-mid front , close-mid front  or mid central  (similarly to the  vowel), whereas its ending point varies between fairly close central  and a more back . To him, variants with central or front onsets sound 'inappropriately posh' in combination with other broad Scouse vowels.

Consonants
 H-dropping, as in many other varieties of Northern England English. This renders hear , high  and hold  variably homophonous with ear , I  and old .
 Like many other accents around the world, G-dropping also occurs, with  being the most common realization of the sequence.
 has several allophones depending on environment:
On the other hand, younger speakers may further debuccalise in polysyllabic words in unstressed syllables, hence aggregate .
T-glottalisation is rarer than in the rest of England, with  occurring before  and syllabic consonants.
  can turn into an affricate or a fricative, determined mostly by the quality of the preceding vowel. If fricative, a palatal, velar or uvular articulation ( respectively) is realised. This is seen distinctively with words like book and clock.
 As with other varieties of English, the voiceless plosives  are aspirated word-initially, except when  precedes in the same syllable. It can also occur word- and utterance-finally, with potential preaspirated pronunciations  (which is often perceived as glottal noise or as oral friction produced in the same environment as the stop) for utterance-final environments, primarily found in female speakers.
 Under Irish influence, the dental stops  are often used instead of the standard dental fricatives , leading to a phonemic distinction between dental and alveolar stops. The fricative forms are also found, whereas th-fronting is not as common.
 The accent is non-rhotic, meaning  is not pronounced unless followed by a vowel. When it is pronounced, it is typically realised as a tap  particularly between vowels (as in mirror ) or in initial clusters (as in breath ), and approximant  otherwise, sometimes also instead of the tap.

Lexicon and syntax
A notable Irish influence include the second person plural "you" as "" . The use of "" instead of "my" is also present, i.e. "" instead of "that's my book you've got there". An exception occurs when "my" is emphasised in an example such as "". Other common Scouse features include the use of "" instead of "give us", which became famous throughout the UK through Boys from the Blackstuff in 1982; the use of the term "" to mean "extremely happy", such as in ""; and the terms "" for "okay" and "" for "great", which can also be used to answer questions of wellbeing such as "I'm boss" in reply to "How are you?" and can also be used sarcastically in negative circumstances (the reply "" in the case of being told bad news translates to the sarcastic use of "good" or "okay").

International recognition

Scouse is highly distinguishable from other English dialects. Because of this international recognition, Keith Szlamp made a request to IANA on 16 September 1996 to make it a recognised Internet dialect. After citing a number of references, the application was accepted on 25 May 2000 and now allows Internet documents that use the dialect to be categorised as Scouse by using the language tag "en-Scouse".

Scouse has also become well known as the accent of The Beatles, an international cultural phenomenon. While the members of the band are famously from Liverpool, their accents have more in common with the older Lancashire-like Liverpool dialect found in the southern suburbs; the accent has evolved into Scouse since the 1960s, mostly in the centre and northern areas of the city, with some identifying the improvement of air quality as a potential factor.

See also
Other northern English dialects include:
Cumbrian (Cumbria)
Geordie (Newcastle)
Lanky (Lancashire)
Mackem (Sunderland)
Mancunian (Manchester)
Pitmatic (Durham and Northumberland)
Tyke (Yorkshire)

References

Bibliography

Further reading

External links
Sounds Familiar: Birkenhead (Scouse) — Listen to examples of Scouse and other regional accents and dialects of the UK on the British Library's 'Sounds Familiar' website
'Hover & Hear' Scouse pronunciations , and compare with other accents from the UK and around the world
Sound map – Accents & dialects in Accents & Dialects, British Library.
BBC – Liverpool Local History – Learn to speak Scouse!
A. B. Z. of Scouse (Lern Yerself Scouse)
IANA registration form for the en-scouse tag
IETF RFC 4646 — Tags for Identifying Languages (2006)
Visit Liverpool — The official tourist board website to Liverpool
A Scouser in California — A syndicated on-air segment that airs on Bolton FM Radio during Kev Gurney's show (7pm to 10pm – Saturdays) and Magic 999 during Roy Basnett's Breakfast (6am to 10am – Monday to Friday)
Clean Air Cleaning Up Old Beatles Accent, ABC News

English language in England
Languages of the United Kingdom
Liverpool
British regional nicknames
City colloquials